Sir Godfrey Webster, 4th Baronet (25 December 1747 – 3 June 1800) was an English politician. He used the additional surname Vassall in the period 1795 to 1797.

Life
He was the son of Sir Godfrey Webster, 3rd Baronet and Elizabeth Cooper of Lockington, Derbyshire, and nephew of Sir Whistler Webster, 2nd Baronet.

In politics
In January 1780 Webster was on a Sussex committee set up to support the reformist Yorkshire Association. In 1783 he was fighting in a Sussex reform meeting for a general petition. In 1786 he entered parliament as MP for Seaford, with support from the Pelham interest, and after a petition. Standing there again in 1790 with John Tarleton, he was defeated, but Tarleton was elected after a petition. He was back in Parliament in 1796, for Wareham.

Personal life
Webster's uncle, the 2nd baronet, died in 1779, and about half a year later his father died in 1780, making him the 4th baronet. He inherited also Battle Abbey with its estate, but not with vacant possession since his aunt remained in residence.

Webster was elected a Fellow of the Royal Society in 1786. He committed suicide, shooting himself on 3 June 1800 after gambling losses.

Family

Webster married, in 1786,  Elizabeth Vassall, daughter and heiress of Richard Vassall of Jamaica. It was a disastrous union which ended in divorce after Elizabeth's repeated affairs with other men. They had three children, not including two sons who died young:
Godfrey Vassall Webster, the 5th baronet;
Henry Vassall Webster; 
Harriet Frances Webster, who married Fleetwood Pellew.

Notes

1747 births
1800 deaths
Baronets in the Baronetage of England
British MPs 1784–1790
Fellows of the Royal Society
British MPs 1796–1800
British politicians who committed suicide
Members of the Parliament of Great Britain for English constituencies